Cherkazoo and Other Stories is a compilation album comprising previously unreleased studio recordings by Ian Gillan from the early 1970s.

The album is divided into two parts. The first eight tracks are taken from the soundtrack to Cherkazoo, a children's story Gillan labored over circa 1972. These songs are reminiscent of psychedelic pop and whimsical British music hall numbers, sounding like Sgt. Pepper's-era Beatles or early pre-Space Oddity Bowie.

Second part of the album features songs that were cut after Gillan's departure from Deep Purple, most likely circa 1974, and find the singer in more familiar territory, namely rock, including a cover of Elvis Presley's "Trying to Get to You".

Line-ups for both sessions have never been fully confirmed but are said to include Jon Lord (keyboards), Roger Glover (bass) and Pete York (drums) on Cherkazoo sessions and Mike Moran (keyboards) and Dave Wintour (bass) on later recordings.

Releases 
The album was originally released in 1992 on RPM in the UK. Further releases came from Spitfire/Eagle (1998, 2005) and Metal Mind (2009).

Compiled by Simon Robinson.

References

External links
 The Deep Purple Podcast - Episode #24 - Cherkazoo and Other Stories (Part 1)
 The Deep Purple Podcast - Episode #25 - Cherkazoo and Other Stories (Part 2)

Warhorse (British band) albums
1970 debut albums
Vertigo Records albums
Ian Gillan albums